Peter Balakian (born June 13, 1951) is an Armenian-American poet, prose writer, and scholar. He is the author of many books including the 2016 Pulitzer prize winning book of poems Ozone Journal, the memoir Black Dog of Fate, winner of the PEN/Albrand award in 1998 and The Burning Tigris: The Armenian Genocide and America's Response, winner of the 2005 Raphael Lemkin Prize and a New York Times best seller (October 2003). Both prose books were New York Times Notable Books. Since 1980 he has taught at Colgate University where he is the Donald M and Constance H Rebar Professor of the Humanities in the department of English and Director of Creative Writing.

Early life 
Peter Balakian, son of physician and sports medicine inventor Gerard Balakian and Arax Aroosian Balakian was born in Teaneck New Jersey and grew up there and in Tenafly, New Jersey. He attended Tenafly public schools, graduated from Englewood School For Boys (now Dwight Englewood School). He earned a B.A. from Bucknell University, and M.A. from NYU, and a Ph.D. in American Civilization from Brown University.

At Bucknell, Balakian studied with the poet and novelist Jack Wheatcroft. He taught for two years at the Dwight-Englewood School where he met his lifetime friend, the poet Bruce Smith with whom he founded the poetry journal Graham House Review (1979–96). In 1976 Balakian began his doctoral studies in the American Civilization Program at Brown University where he wrote his dissertation on the poet Theodore Roethke under the direction of Hyatt H. Waggoner and David Hirsch. His dissertation was later published as Theodore Roethke's Far Fields (LSU 1989). He joined the faculty at Colgate University in 1980 where he has taught in the English department since; he was co-founder of the Creative Writing Program and has been the director of the program since 2002.  He is the Donald M. and Constance H. Rebar Professor of the Humanities in the department of English. He was also the first director of Colgate's Center for Ethics and World Societies in 1999. In 2019 he received Colgate's Jerome Balmuth Distinguished Teaching Award.

Career 
David Wojahn in Tikkun (Spring 2016) wrote that,"few American poets of the boomer generation have explored the interstices of public and personal history as deeply and urgently as has Balakian, and his significance as a poet of social consciousness is complemented by his work in other genres."

Balakian's second book of poems Sad Days of Light (1983), dealt the history, trauma and memory of a global catastrophe-the Armenian Genocide-and its impact across generations. Shirley Horner in The New York Times wrote, "Like William Carlos Williams in Paterson, Balakian displays a powerful talent in resurrecting the past, lyrically, transforming the story of his heritage into an affirmative history for all survivors."

In The Christian Science Monitor, Steven Ratiner wrote, "It is in its restrained but intimate tone, its faithfulness to the small human detail, that the poetry reaches its broadest context. As we witness the destruction of a kitchen or the anguish of one old woman, we somehow come to understand the meaning of holocaust.''

His  collection Ziggurat (2010) dealt with the aftermath of 9/11 by excavating the ruins of the Sumerian past. The British poet Carol Rumens in The Guardian wrote, "The power of the poems in Ziggurat is in the range of experiences and knowledge they respond to, the linguistic energies deployed and the skill with which the narrative is layered, so that it resonates not only as historical commentary, but with pertinence to the present moment."

In an interview with the New York Times after winning the Pulitzer Prize in April, 2016, Balakian said, "poetry in particular has a great capacity to absorb history, and to make historical memory a dynamic contemporary force."  To The Washington Post Balakian said, "I'm interested in pushing the form of poetry, pushing it to have more stakes, more openness to the complexity of contemporary experience."

Balakian's work as a poet and a prose writer has also influenced modern Armenian literature. Writing in World Literature Today ( January 2016), Keith Garibian called Balakian, "the preeminent Armenian writer in English today, whether the genre is poetry, memoir, or history or literary criticism." About Balakian's recent book of poems No Sign (2022), Ilya Kaminsky writes: “Balakian understands the bewildered music of our times, and No Sign, more than any other contemporary book of poetry, teaches us about the properties of time; we are inside the speech that is addressing time and opposing it, witnessing it, and walking two steps ahead. This ‘time-sense’ is explored with depth in the brilliant title poem. Balakian is able to praise the world though he knows its ‘bitter history.’ And praise he does! The lyricism here is of utter beauty. No Sign is a splendid, necessary book.”—Ilya Kaminsky, author of Deaf Republic

Prose 
Balakian's memoir Black Dog of Fate (1997) dealt with an Armenian American boy's coming of age in affluent suburban New Jersey of the 1950s and '60s as he comes to uncover the unspoken trauma of the Armenian genocide his grandparents survived. The book received the PEN/Albrand Award for memoir, was a New York Times Notable Book, and a book of the year for Publishers Weekly.

Sybil Steinberg editor at Publishers Weekly on the Charlie Rose Show noted that Balakian's memoir was pushing against the self-obsessed American memoir and creating a new orientation for the genre. Joyce Carol Oates in The New Yorker called it "a richly imagined memoir, carefully documented, that asks painful questions of us all." The Philadelphia Inquirer  called it "a landmark chapter in the literature of witness." Dinitia Smith's feature on Balakian in the New York Times  "A Poet Knits Together Memories of Armenian Horrors," credited Black Dog of Fate with opening up a new space in memory culture.

His 2004 book The Burning Tigris: The Armenian Genocide and America's Response debuted at No. 4 on the New York Times bestseller list. In this narrative history, Balakian brought together two stories: the Ottoman Turkish Empire's eradication of its Armenian Christian minority population of more than two million people during the Hamidian massacres of the 1890s and in the genocide of 1915, and a little known history of how Americans became international human rights activists for the Armenians during the period of 1895 to 1925 and launched the first international human rights mission in American history.

Theodore Roethke's Far Fields was published in 1988. Balakian's Vise and Shadow: Essays on the Lyric Imagination, Poetry, Art, and Culture was published in 2015. His collaborative translations from the Armenian include: Bloody News From My Friend by Siamanto (with Nevart Yaghlian); Armenian Golgotha, a memoir, by Grigoris Balakian (with Aris Sevag) (2009); The Ruins of Ani by Krikor Balakian with Aram Arkun.

Public Intellectual Work 
For decades, Balakian has worked to combat the Turkish government's denial and propaganda campaigns which is aimed at suppressing the history of the Armenian Genocide and pressuring the US and other nations not to acknowledge it. Balakian has argued that the Armenian Genocide became the template for other genocides which were carried out in a modern modality and he has also argued that it was an influence on the Nazi genocide of the Jews of Europe. (The Burning Tigris, 2003),

His work with fellow writers and scholars Robert Jay Lifton, Susan Sontag, Deborah Lipstadt, Elie Wiesel, Samantha Power, and Robert Melson resulted in changes on how the Armenian genocide was covered in the media and dealt with in the classroom. In 1996, Balakian and Lifton circulated a national petition  that was published in the Chronicle of Higher Education, "Princeton Accused of Fronting For the Turkish Government," calling attention to Turkish efforts to intimidate scholars and corrupt academic appointments with the case of Heath Lowry at Princeton as an example.

In March 2004, Balakian, Samantha Power and Holocaust scholar Robert Melson met with Executive Editor Bill Keller at the New York Times in a meeting that changed how the Armenian Genocide is covered by the Times. Balakian co-authored a letter about the issue published in the Times. In 2005, Balakian and Elie Wiesel had a similar meeting with Associated Press foreign desk editor Larry Heinzerling, also resulting in a policy change.

In August 2020, Balakian was a founding member of the group Writers for Democratic Action. The founding steering committee included Todd Gitlin, Paul Auster, James Carroll, Siri Hustvedt, Askold Melnyczuk, Natasha Trethewey, Carolyn Forché, Sophie Auster, Julia Lattimer and Shuchi Saraswat.

About President Biden's statement of acknowledgment of the Armenian Genocide on April 24, 2021, Balakian wrote in an op-ed in The Washington Post  "No American president until Biden has had the courage to use the word "genocide" for fear of angering Turkey's leaders and damaging relations with a powerful ally, even one with an abominable human rights record."  His appearances in the media on the issue include: 60 Minutes, "The Struggle for History" with Bob Simon; the Charlie Rose Show; Fresh Air with Terry Gross; ABC World News Tonight with Peter Jennings; National Public Radio's Weekend Edition and All Things Considered, and in various documentaries including the PBS documentary The Armenian Genocide ( 2006 directed by Andrew Goldberg), and the documentary Intent To Destroy, directed by Joe Berlinger.

Balakian's political and cultural commentary and op-eds have appeared in The Washington Post, The Guardian, Salon, LA Times, Boston Globe, and The Daily Beast, and his essays about art and literature have appeared in Art In America, Poetry, New York Times Magazine, Tikkun, Literary Hub, The Chronicle of Higher Education, and many scholarly journals. In addition to his book prizes, Balakian's other awards include a Guggenheim Fellowship, an NEA Fellowship, the Presidential Medal, and the Movses Khoranatsi medal from Armenia, and the Spendlove Prize for Social Justice, Tolerance, and Diplomacy.

Personal life 
Balakian was married to Helen Kebabian, director of government, foundation, and corporate relations at Colgate University. Balakian's daughter, Sophia, is a cultural anthropologist who teaches at George Mason University and is married to the fiction writer Michael Don, author of the story collection Partners and Strangers. Balakian's son, James, is a senior consultant for Deloitte in the Government and Public Services Division in Washington DC.

Balakian is the nephew of former New York Times Book Review editor Nona Balakian (1918-1991), literary scholar Anna Balakian (1915-1997), and great-great nephew of Grigoris Balakian (1878-1934), memoirist and nonfiction writer and Bishop in the Armenian Apostolic Church.

Works 
Poetry
Father Fisheye (1979) , 
Sad Days of Light (1983) , 
Reply From Wilderness Island (1988)
Dyer's Thistle (1996) , 
June-Tree: New and Selected Poems, 1974–2000 (2001)
Ziggurat (2010) , 
Ozone Journal (2015)
No Sign (2022)

Prose	
Theodore Roethke's Far Fields (1989) , 
Black Dog of Fate, A Memoir (1997)	(translated into Armenian by Artem Harutyunyan, 2002)	, 
The Burning Tigris: The Armenian Genocide and America's Response (2003)
Vise and Shadow: Essays on the Lyric Imagination, Poetry, Art, and Culture (2015)

Translation
Bloody News From My Friend, by Siamanto, translated by Peter Balakian and Nevart Yaghlian, introduction by Balakian (1996)
Armenian Golgotha, by Grigoris Balakian, translated by Peter Balakian and Aris Sevag (2009)

Editor
Ambassador Morgenthau's Story, preface by Robert Jay Lifton, introduction by Roger Smith, afterword by Henry Morgenthau III. (2003)
A Slant of Light; Reflections on Jack Wheatcroft, edited by Peter Balakian and Bruce Smith, Bucknell University Press (2018) 

Limited Editions
Declaring Generations, linoleum engravings by Barnard Taylor ( 1981)
Invisible Estate, woodcuts by Rosalyn Richards (1985)
The Oriental Rug, linoleum engravings by Barnard Taylor (1986)
The Children's Museum at Yad Vashem, illustrated by Colleen Shannon (1996)
(all from The Press of Appletree Alley, Lewisburg, PA)

Recordings
Poetry on Record, 1888–2006: 98 Poets Read their Work (Tennyson, Whitman, Yeats, through Modernism to present). Four-CD set. Balakian reading "The History of Armenia"

References

External links 

 Interview transcript & audio of Balakian reading his poems: Cortland Review, March 2001
 
 Biography at HarperCollins
 What you need to know about Peter Balakian, the new Pulitzer Prize-winning poet
 Presentation of Lemkin Award to Peter Balakian to Feature Rare Film of Raphael Lemkin, The Armenian Reporter, October 29, 2005
 Black Dog of Fate by Balakian, Student Reviews, 2004
 Peter Balakian on Poetry Foundation

1951 births
Living people
Poets from New Jersey
American writers of Armenian descent
Armenian American literature
Bucknell University alumni
Dwight-Englewood School alumni
New York University alumni
Brown University alumni
Colgate University faculty
People from Teaneck, New Jersey
People from Tenafly, New Jersey
American memoirists
Ethnic Armenian translators
Armenian–English translators
American translators
Pulitzer Prize for Poetry winners